was a Japanese actor and voice actor who was most known for the roles of Takeshi Goda before Suneo Honekawa in Fujiko F. Fujio's Doraemon.

Career
During his life he had been attached to TBS broadcast theater company and then Aoni Production, Production Baobab, he became a director of his own agency 21st century FOX; he was attached to 81 Produce at the time of his death. He was known to voice many characters in anime series for 62 years. He appeared in children's anime and educational programmes. In addition to Doraemon, he had prominent roles in Cyborg 009 (as 007/Great Britain), Dracula (Kaibutsu-kun), Kemumaki Kemuzou (Ninja Hattori-kun), Pāyan (Perman), Iyami (Osomatsu-kun), Quackerjack (Darkwing Duck), Tom (Tom and Jerry), Benzou Karino (Kiteretsu Daihyakka), Horrorman (Soreike! Anpanman), Conductor (Galaxy Express 999) and Jiminy Cricket (Japanese dub of Pinocchio and all other appearances). He was the mentor of Kappei Yamaguchi.

Gian
In 1973, he was cast in the first Nippon TeleMovie Productions's adaptation of Fujiko F. Fujio's Doraemon series as Takeshi Goda (Gian or Jaian), a strong and quick-tempered local bully who can fight at any time and with any kid he sees, especially Nobita, alongside co-stars Yoshiko Ota (Nobita Nobi), Ebisu Masako (Shizuka Minamoto), Shun Yashiro (Suneo Honekawa), Kōsei Tomita and Masako Nozawa (Doraemon) before Kazuya Tatekabe succeeded him.

Conductor
In 1978, Kimotsuki was cast in Leiji Matsumoto's Galaxy Express 999 as the Conductor, the main crew member of the Galaxy Express 999. He is an alien being with an invisible body; only his eyes can be seen while he is wearing his conductor uniform, alongside his co-stars Masako Nozawa (Tetsuro Hoshino) and Masako Ikeda (Maetel). When it came time for the 1990s film the cast reprised the roles yet again. From there he continued to voice the character in practically every adaptation made during his lifetime, the sole exception being the PlayStation 2 games from the early 2000s. In 2002, he reunited with Nozawa and Ikeda to reprise their respective roles for the OVA and TV series.

Suneo
1979 saw Kimotsuki's return to the Doraemon franchise when he was cast in the 1979 anime series, this time as character Suneo Honekawa, a fox-faced (inherited from his mother) rich child who loves to flaunt his material wealth before everyone, especially Nobita, succeeding Yashiro in the 1973 anime series alongside co-stars Nobuyo Ōyama (Doraemon), Noriko Ohara (Nobita Nobi), Michiko Nomura (Shizuka Minamoto), Kazuya Tatekabe (Takeshi Goda(Jaian)) and Keiko Yokozawa (Dorami) for 26 years after the end of the 1979 series,

Horrorman
In 1991, he was cast in Soreike! Anpanman as Horrorman, a skeleton who often works with Baikinman and Dokin-chan. Alongside co-stars Ryūsei Nakao (Baikinman) and Hiromi Tsuru (Dokinchan) for 25 years.

Death
On October 20, 2016, Kimotsuki died from pneumonia at the age of 80.

Successors
Yōhei Tadano Kingdom Hearts III (Jiminy Cricket)
Kazuki Yao Soreike! Anpanman (Horrorman)

Filmography

Television animation
1960s
Astro Boy (TV 1/1963) (1963)
Big X (1964)
Pāman (1967) (Kabao)
Hokkyoku no Muushika Miishika (Rika The Fox)

1970s
New Obake no Q-tarou (1971_ (Gojira)
Calimero (1972) (Piero)
Doraemon (Nippon Television Version) (1973) (Gian)
Great Mazinger  (1974) (Reptilian General Draydou)
Heidi, Girl of the Alps (1974) (Sebastion)
Ganso Tensai Bakabon (1975) (Omawari-san or Honkan-san)
Candy Candy (1976) (Alistair Cornwell)
Dokaben (1976) (Kazuto Tonoma)
Galaxy Express 999 (1978) (Conductor)
Cyborg 009 (1979) (007/Great Britain)
Doraemon (TV Asahi Version) (1979) (Suneo Honekawa)
Bannertail: The Story of Gray Squirrel (1979) (Radoru)

1980s
Ashita no Joe (1980)(Hyoromatsu)
Kaibutsu-kun (TV Asahi Version) (1980) (Dracula)
The Littl' Bits (1980) (Dr. Docklin aka "Dr. Snoozabit")
Astro Boy) (1980) (Dr. Mazeb, Drop-3)
Ninja Hattori-kun (1981) (Kemumaki Kemuzou)
Magical Angel Creamy Mami (1983) (Nega)
Pāman (1983) (Pāyan)
Obake no Q-tarō (1985) (Hakase)
Ultraman Kids' Proverb Stories (1986) (Gattsun)
Osomatsu-kun (1988) (Iyami)
Kiteretsu Daihyakka (1988) (Benzō Karino, Kiteretsu Kite)
Wowser (1988) (Professor Dinghy)

1990s
Anpanman (1991) (Horrorman)
Soreike! Anpanman (1991) (Horrorman)
Ultraman Kids: 30 Million Light Years Looking for Mama (1991) (Gattsun)
Kindaichi Case Files (1997) - Yuichiro Matoba
Jungle de Ikou! (1997) (Aham)
Trigun (1998) (Leonof the Puppet-Master)

2000s
Konjiki no Gash Bell!! (2003) (Grisa)
Black Jack (TV) (2004) (Maestro Morozoff)

2010s
Yūki Yūna wa Yūsha de Aru (2014) (Yoshiteru)

Theatrical animation
Do It! Yasuji's Pornorama (1971)
Hans Christian Andersen's The Little Mermaid (1975) (Crab, Conch)
Galaxy Express 999 (film) (Conductor)
Adieu Galaxy Express 999 (Conductor)
Galaxy Express 999 for Planetarium (Conductor)
Galaxy Express 999: Eternal Fantasy (Conductor)
Galaxy Express 999: Glass no Clair (Conductor)
Legend of the Galactic Heroes (1992) (Huang Rui)
Inuyasha the Movie: Swords of an Honorable Ruler (2003) (Saya)
Doraemon Movie Series (Suneo Honekawa)
Doraemon: Nobita's Dinosaur (1980)
Doraemon: The Records of Nobita, Spaceblazer (1981) 
Doraemon: Nobita and the Haunts of Evil (1982)
Doraemon: Nobita and the Castle of the Undersea Devil (1983)
Doraemon: Nobita's Great Adventure into the Underworld (1984)
Doraemon: Nobita's Little Star Wars (1985)
Doraemon: Nobita and the Steel Troops (1986)
Doraemon: Nobita and the Knights on Dinosaurs (1987)
Doraemon: The Record of Nobita's Parallel Visit to the West (1988)
Doraemon: Nobita and the Birth of Japan (1989)
Doraemon: Nobita and the Animal Planet (1990)
Doraemon: Nobita's Dorabian Nights (1991)
Doraemon: Nobita and the Kingdom of Clouds (1992)
Doraemon: Nobita and the Tin Labyrinth (1993)
Doraemon: Nobita's Three Visionary Swordsmen (Snemis) (1994)
Doraemon: Nobita's Diary of the Creation of the World (1995)
Doraemon: Nobita and the Galaxy Super-express (1996)
Doraemon: Nobita and the Spiral City (1997)
Doraemon: Nobita's Great Adventure in the South Seas (1998)
Doraemon: Nobita Drifts in the Universe (1999)
Doraemon: Nobita and the Legend of the Sun King (2000)
Doraemon: Nobita and the Winged Braves (2001)
Doraemon: Nobita in the Robot Kingdom (2002)
Doraemon: Nobita and the Windmasters (2003)
Doraemon: Nobita in the Wan-Nyan Spacetime Odyssey (2004)

Video games
Doraemon Series (Suneo Honekawa)
Kingdom Hearts series (Jiminy Cricket)

Tokusatsu
Robot Detective (Kowashiman (ep. 5 - 6), Karateman (ep. 19 - 20))
Ganbare!! Robocon (Roboinu)
Chōriki Sentai Ohranger (Butler Acha (eps. 1 - 15, 17 - 20, 22 - 31, 33, 35 - 48))
Choriki Sentai Ohranger Movie (Butler Acha)
Gekisou Sentai Carranger (TT Terurin (ep. 24))
Moero!!! Robocon (Robogeta)

Dubbing

Live-action
The Empire Strikes Back (Cal Alder)
Ewoks: The Battle for Endor (Willy)
Frankenstein's Army (Dr. Viktor Frankenstein (Karel Roden))
The Human Centipede 3 (Final Sequence) (Dwight Butler (Laurence R. Harvey))

Animation
The Aristocats (Roquefort)
Darkwing Duck (Quackerjack)
Josie and the Pussycats (Sebastian the Cat)
The Little Mermaid (Scuttle)
Pinocchio (Jiminy Cricket)
Police Academy: The Animated Series (Additional voices)
Robin Hood (Friar Tuck)
Tom and Jerry (Tom)

Japanese voice-over
Pinocchio's Daring Journey (Jiminy Cricket)
Star Tours (F-24)
Sindbad's Storybook Voyage (Announce)
E.T. Adventure (Bigzom)
The Amazing Adventure of Spider-Man the Ride (Kaidorten)

References

External links
 

1935 births
2016 deaths
Aoni Production voice actors
Deaths from pneumonia in Japan
Japanese male stage actors
Japanese male video game actors
Japanese male voice actors
Japanese theatre directors
Male voice actors from Kagoshima Prefecture
Production Baobab voice actors
81 Produce voice actors